The 1911 Coronation Match was a men's team golf competition between teams of amateur and professional golfers. It was played at Royal St George's Golf Club on 24 June 1911, the Saturday before the 1911 Open Championship, to celebrate the coronation of George V two days earlier. The match replaced the annual England–Scotland Professional Match which had been played just before the Open Championship since 1903.

The amateur team consisted of 11 Englishmen, 5 Scotsmen, one Irishman and one American while the professional team consisted of 11 Englishmen, 5 Scotsmen, one Irishman and one Frenchman. The match resulted in an overwhelming win for the professionals by 8 matches to 1, most of the matches being quite one-sided.

Format
The match was contested on a single day with nine 36-hole foursomes matches. As with the England–Scotland Professional Match, the players went off in a seeded order.

Results
Jack White was initially selected but was indisposed and replaced by another Scot, James Hepburn.

References

Team golf tournaments
Recurring sporting events established in 1911
Coronation Match